Headline Hunters is a 1955 American crime film directed by William Witney and written by Frederick Louis Fox and John K. Butler. The film stars Rod Cameron, Julie Bishop, Ben Cooper, Raymond Greenleaf, Chubby Johnson and John Warburton. The film was released on September 15, 1955 by Republic Pictures.

Plot

Cast      
Rod Cameron as Hugh 'Woody' Woodruff
Julie Bishop as Laura Stewart
Ben Cooper as David Flynn
Raymond Greenleaf as Paul Strout
Chubby Johnson as Ned Powers
John Warburton as Harvey S. Kevin
Nacho Galindo as Ramon
Virginia Carroll as Elsie Hoffman
Howard Wright as Harry Bradley
Stuart Randall as Frank Hoffman
Edward Colmans as Rafael Garcia
Joe Besser as Coroner

References

External links 
 

1955 films
American crime films
1955 crime films
Republic Pictures films
Films directed by William Witney
Films about journalists
1950s English-language films
1950s American films
American black-and-white films